Elliott Omar Power-Taiwo, simply known as Elliott Power (often stylised as ELLIOTT POWER), is an English recording artist and commercial director born and raised in West London. Power released his debut single Sink/Swim in 2013 on Marathon Artists. His debut album Once Smitten was released in 2016 as a Marathon Artists and Mo' Wax collaboration. In 2015 The Elliott Power songs Sword Souls and On The Windrush were remixed by UNKLE and featured on Global Underground #GU41: James Lavelle Presents UNKLE Sounds - Naples compilation.
 In 2022 Elliott Power received a nomination for a Primetime Emmy Award for Outstanding Commercial for Meta "Skate Nation Ghana" a film he co-directed alongside Bafic and Justyna Obasi.

Background 
Elliott Power was born in Ealing Hospital in Southall, London, and was raised in Brentford, West London. He attended Little Ealing Primary School, Isleworth & Syon Secondary School and the University of Roehampton. Power's Mother is of English and Irish descent, his Father is of Nigerian and Trinidadian descent. Power met his production partner Dorian Lutz through a mutual friend when he was 15 years old. Dorian's uncle had a small recording studio just off Askew Road in Shepherd's Bush, West London. Lutz had invited Power down to the studio, he described their first encounter in a written interview with Vulture:
 I'd never been in a professional studio before, with a booth, mixing desk and proper mics and stuff and here was this 14 year old skinny kid, Dorian - setting everything up, using a mixing desk and engineering the whole session. From that day I knew he was a special talent.

It wasn't until Elliott Power was 21 years old that he started taking music seriously, and started trying to shop his then-demo with little success. Power went onto release his debut single "Sink/Swim" through Marathon Artists in May 2013. Elliott Power went onto sign an album deal with Marathon Artists and released his debut album Once Smitten as a collaborative project with James Lavelle's Mo' Wax in February 2016.

In 2020 Elliott Power directed a branded content film for Hennessy following the rise of the chess player Maurice Ashley, the first black person to attain the title of Grandmaster.

On 12 April 2021 vogue.com premiered Eartheater's Faith Consuming Hope music video directed by Elliott Power. The video was filmed in Kyiv, Ukraine and depicts Eartheater as a runaway nun breaking free from religious dogmas of her childhood.

Power directed the lead single Paper Doll from Miink’s second album Notice Me. Released on June 23, 2022, the music video explores the cultures and ideals of the enslaved blended on the long trans-Atlantic trips, creating new cultural practices, religions, and philosophies. Paper Doll specifically looks at the themes of death and rebirth within this wider concept. The video was shot over a period of 12 hours in San Juan Texcalpan, Atlatlahucan, Mexico.

Filmography

Music Videos

Commercials

Discography

Studio albums

Mixtapes

Extended plays

Singles

As featured artist

Guest appearances

Uncredited appearances

Music videos

As lead artist

As featured artist

Awards and nominations

AICP Show

|-
| rowspan=7|2022
| rowspan=7|Meta "Skate Nation Ghana"  
|-
| Advertising Excellence || 
|-
| Editorial || 
|-
| Licensed Soundtrack or Arrangement || 
|-
| Production || 
|-

British Arrows

|-
| rowspan=7|2022
| rowspan=7|Meta "Skate Nation Ghana"  
|-
| Editing
| style="background:#CD7F32"| Craft Bronze
|-

Cannes Lions

|-
| rowspan=7|2022
| rowspan=7|Meta "Skate Nation Ghana"  
|-
| Editing
| style="background:#C0C0C0"| Silver Lion
|-

Ciclope Festival

|-
| rowspan=7|2021
| rowspan=7|Meta "Skate Nation Ghana"  
|-
| Color Grading || 
|-
| Direction (91 to 180 Seconds)|| 
|-
| Cinematography || 
|-
| Editing || 
|-

Clio Awards

|-
| rowspan=7|2022
| rowspan=7|Meta "Skate Nation Ghana"  
|-
| Editing 
| style="background:#FFD700"| Gold
|-
| Direction
| style="background:#CD7F32"| Bronze
|-
| Cinematography
| style="background:#CD7F32"| Bronze
|-

D&AD Awards

|-
| rowspan=7|2022
| rowspan=7|Meta "Skate Nation Ghana"  
|-
| Casting / Street Casting
| style="background:#FFBF00"| Yellow Pencil
|-
| Editing 
| style="background:#FFBF00"| Yellow Pencil
|-
| Direction
| style="background:#BF8040"| Wood Pencil
|-
| Sound Design & Use of Music
| style="background:#BF8040"| Wood Pencil
|-
| Writing for Advertising
| style="background:#BF8040"| Wood Pencil
|-
| Cinematography ||

Primetime Emmy Awards

|-
| rowspan=7|2022
| rowspan=7|Meta "Skate Nation Ghana"  
|-
| |Primetime Emmy Award for Outstanding Commercial

| 
|-

References

External links
 

Living people
21st-century English singers
British contemporary R&B singers
British spoken word artists
British trip hop musicians
English electronic musicians
English male poets
English male rappers
English people of Irish descent
English people of Nigerian descent
English people of Trinidad and Tobago descent
English male singer-songwriters
People from Brentford
People from Southall
Rappers from London
Writers from London
21st-century British male singers
Year of birth missing (living people)